Mario Peña (born 7 September 1940) is a Mexican basketball player. He competed in the men's tournament at the 1964 Summer Olympics.

References

External links
 

1940 births
Living people
Mexican men's basketball players
1963 FIBA World Championship players
Olympic basketball players of Mexico
Basketball players at the 1964 Summer Olympics
Place of birth missing (living people)